A list of films produced in Pakistan in 1973 (see 1973 in film):

1973

See also
1973 in Pakistan

External links
 Search Pakistani film - IMDB.com

1973
Pakistani
Films